Dangshan South railway station is a railway station of Zhengzhou–Xuzhou High-Speed Railway in Dangshan County, Suzhou, Anhui, China. The station started operation on 10 September 2016, together with the Railway.

References

Railway stations in Anhui
Stations on the Xuzhou–Lanzhou High-Speed Railway
Railway stations in China opened in 2016
Dangshan County